The Clerkenwell Workhouse stood on Coppice Row, Farringdon Road, in London. The original workhouse was built in 1727 but that building was replaced by one twice as large in 1790. It was described by The Lancet in 1865 as one of the two worst in London, and "fit for nothing but to be destroyed" which it was in 1883.

References

External links 

Workhouses in London
Clerkenwell
Former buildings and structures in London
Buildings and structures demolished in 1883